Otahuhu College is a secondary school in Auckland, New Zealand for students years 9 to 13.

Location
It is located in the suburb of Otahuhu and is a co-educational school. The main campus entrance is on Mangere Road, the Memorial Field sports complex is at a separate venue also on Mangere Road. In 2021 the school celebrated its 90th year, having opened in 1931. In 1931 the school was called Otahuhu Junior High School. In 1933 courses were extended to include senior levels of study and school was called Otahuhu Technical High School. In 1947 the school became Otahuhu College.

Structure
Otahuhu College is divided into four houses:

Each house is controlled by a House Leader, and each house has a Head Boy, Head Girl and a Deputy Head Girl and Deputy Head Boy.

At the end of 2006 Otahuhu College A-Block building was earthquake strengthened. The Sturges Field sports facilities were refurbished after 2007.
In 2016 the Science Block was opened.

Principals
F.W. Martin, 1931–1941
George W.C. Drake, 1942–1960
Glendining Anstice, 1960–1971
Owen T. Boscawen, 1972–1985
Bill A. Gavin, 1985–2001
Brian O'Connell, 2002–2003
Gil Laurenson, 2004–2013
Neil Watson, 2013–present

Demographics
At the March 2019 Education Review Office (ERO) review of the school, Otahuhu College had 895 students enrolled. There was an even split of male and female students. The prioritised ethnic composition was 33% Samoan, 23% Tongan, 13% Indian, 12% Māori, 9% Cook Islands Maori, and 10% other ethnic groups.

Notable alumni

Academia
 Ron Crocombe - Emeritus Professor at the University of the South Pacific

Public service
 Sir James Belich (1927–2015), former Mayor of Wellington
 Sir Barry Curtis, longest-serving mayor in New Zealand
 Rt Hon. David Lange, former Prime Minister of New Zealand
Shaneel Lal, former Youth MP and founder of End Conversion Therapy New Zealand

Sport
 Orene Ai'i - rugby union player
 Olsen Filipaina - rugby league player
 Mark Hunt - Mixed Martial Arts fighter
 Ali Lauiti'iti - rugby league player
 Brett Leaver - field hockey player
 Tupou Neiufi - Paralympian swimmer
 Ropati Brothers, Joe, Tea, Iva - rugby league players
 David Tua - boxer.
 Roger Tuivasa-Sheck - rugby league player
 Cooper Vuna - rugby league and rugby union player
 Waka Nathan All Black

Former staff
 Tammy Wilson, former Auckland Storm and Black Fern
 Yvette Williams, Olympic gold medallist (1952 long jump). PE teacher

References

Educational institutions established in 1931
Secondary schools in Auckland
1931 establishments in New Zealand